is  the head coach of the Gunma Crane Thunders in the Japanese B.League.

Head coaching record

|- 
| style="text-align:left;"|Levanga Hokkaido
| style="text-align:left;"|2014-15
| 38||18||20|||| style="text-align:center;"|6th in Eastern|||-||-||-||
| style="text-align:center;"|-
|-
| style="text-align:left;"|Levanga Hokkaido
| style="text-align:left;"|2015-16
| 55||28||27|||| style="text-align:center;"|6th in Eastern|||2||0||2||
| style="text-align:center;"|6th place
|-
| style="text-align:left;"|Levanga Hokkaido
| style="text-align:left;"|2016-17
| 60||23||37|||| style="text-align:center;"|4th in Eastern|||-||-||-||
| style="text-align:center;"|-
|-
| style="text-align:left;"|Levanga Hokkaido
| style="text-align:left;"|2017-18
| 60||26||34|||| style="text-align:center;"| 6th in Eastern|||-||-||-||
| style="text-align:center;"|-
|-

References

1982 births
Living people
Alvark Tokyo coaches
Japanese basketball coaches
Levanga Hokkaido coaches